T.K.O. (The Knock Out) is the eighth studio album by American singer-songwriter Mya. It is the follow-up to her album Smoove Jones (2016) and was released April 20, 2018, on her label Planet 9 to commemorate the twentieth anniversary of her debut album Mya (1998). Recorded between 2015–2016, T.K.O. is solely produced in its entirely by musician and producer Lamar "MyGuyMars" Edwards with additional production from Los Da Mystro, Lyle LeDuff, Hardwerk and Khirye Tyler.

Sonically, T.K.O. is a contemporary R&B album fusing elements of 1970s and 1990s R&B with a more modern, contemporary sound and serves as departure from her previous studio effort Smoove Jones, which paid homage to traditional R&B from the 1970s, '80s, and '90s. T.K.O. has spawned eight singles – "Ready for Whatever", "Ready, Part II", "You Got Me", "Damage", "Knock You Out", "With You", "Down" and "Open".

Development

T.K.O. (The Knock Out) was recorded between 2015 and 2016 after the release of Smoove Jones (2016). Like with all her independent projects, Harrison served as executive producer for T.K.O. (The Knock Out) as well, which entailed her scouting for producers, songwriters, arranging the album's track listing, and keeping track of the accounting. With T.K.O. though, Harrison decided to form a partnership with musician and producer Lamar "MyGuyMars" Edwards. Edwards had contributed production on her last studio effort, Smoove Jones, which catered more towards traditional R&B. The creation process for T.K.O. started when Harrison continued to work with Edwards and formed a musical partnership. Speaking with Billboard, Harrison acknowledged the process to the project was "easy." However, before dabbling into the contemporary R&B space for her next independent project, Harrison made the conscious decision to release Smoove Jones first to satisfy longtime fans that connected with that particular sound, which is more eclectic, classic and old school. Musically with T.K.O., since contemporary R&B is more current sonically, Harrison and Edwards just essentially incorporated and fused it with 90's R&B, SWV, Aaliyah, R.Kelly, Mint Condition along with Prince, Teddy Pendergrass and The Isley Brothers influences from the 70s. Using material she recorded back in 2011, 2015, and 2016 from her archive, Harrison commented it was all about "building" and "tweaking" songs.  Commenting on the results, Harrison said, "It was all about creating a nice experience for R&B fans, R&B lovers, and have it apply to today's sound of music, sonically, and that's what we did." As executive producer, Harrison was held responsible for drafting all of her contracts, handling publishing split sheets, and generating her own revenue for/funding each component of a project and to avoid early leakage of the project or any of her music, Harrison drafts and services a pre- and post-recording agreement to hold the producers, writers, artists, and engineers liable for leakage, sharing, placement, and playing of her music.

Composition

Music and songs
Described as Smoove Jones part two, T.K.O. serves as continuation on Harrison's last studio effort except with Smoove Jones, she blended  R&B/soul/hip hop genre with elements of the 1970s, 1980s, and 1990s and geared towards traditional R&B, while T.K.O.  is current contemporary R&B with a hint of '90s R&B and influences from the '70s. In terms of sounds, Mya revealed early on that the album is very heavily leaning on R&B slow jams. T.K.O. (The Knock Out) starts with "Open" featuring DMV rapper GoldLink and is described as a slice of atmospheric trap-flavored R&B. The pulsating, "Down" serves as the album's fourth track. Track five, "Ready For Whatever 2.0" is a reimagining of the album's first single and is an homage to Aaliyah's effortless cool. Inspired by Mint Condition and Prince, "Damage" was recorded back in 2011 and serves as the album's sixth track. Track eight, "You Got Me" is a millennial slow jam that blends combination of steady drums and synths reminiscent of the 90's R&B. The spacey, "Knock You Out" is an Isley Brothers-indebted bedroom jam with guitar licks and spaced-out vocal harmonies and serves as the album's tenth track. The album's final track, the '80s/'90s big ballad "If Tomorrow Never Comes" was originally recorded back in 2011 and inspired by the vocal work of R&B group Jodeci.

Release and promotion
Initially, T.K.O. (The Knock Out) was scheduled for a Valentine Day release to commemorate the twentieth anniversary of her debut single, "It's All About Me," however the project was unable to make its deadline and pushed back. In an interview with Hot 97, Mya confirmed T.K.O. was scheduled for an April 20, 2018 release to commemorate the twentieth anniversary of her debut album Mya (1998).  Digitally, the release was distributed through indie distribution company, The Orchard. Her first release under Sony Music  company. Through her official website store, physical copies was made available for purchase exclusively in standard, autographed or personalized editions. In honor of her twentieth anniversary and to celebrate T.K.O.s album release Mya performed at the House of Blues in New York City on April 27, 2018. She held a private album listening session at UnplugdLA's The Study in Los Angeles, California.

Singles
In September 2017, Mya began releasing a series of singles in support of the album. Mya released the first single from  T.K.O.(The Knock Out), "Ready for Whatever" on September 22, 2017. A music video for "Ready for Whatever" was produced and directed by Mya co-starring R&B singer Kevin McCall as her love interest. Less than two months, its follow up single and sequel, "Ready, Part II" was released on November 24, 2017. The song paid homage to R. Kelly's "It Seems Like You're Ready". A third single, "You Got Me", was released on February 14, 2018, to commemorate the twentieth anniversary of her debut single "It's All About Me". "Damage", the fourth single from T.K.O. was released on March 23, 2018. Less than a month, a week before the album's release, "Knock You Out" was released as an instant grat download when fans pre-ordered T.K.O. (The Knock Out) alongside previous singles "You Got Me" and "Damage." In 2019, as tradition in honor her debut single, Harrison gifted her fans with a new music video to commemorate the anniversary. "With You" was released February 14, 2019. Approximately two months later, in honor of the one year anniversary of her thirteenth studio project, TKO (The Knock Out), Harrison gifted her fans with another new video. "Down" was released April 20, 2019.

Artwork
For the album's packaging, Mya traveled to Nassau, Bahamas and completed a photoshoot for her single and album covers. On the album cover, Mya is dressed in black lingerie with a black robe draping her body, while directing a smoldering stare into the camera.

Reception

Critical
Paper magazine gave T.K.O. a favorable review and called it "impressive in its scope" and concluded, "throughout TKO, though Mya is a well-studied product of her influences, she is as an artist all her own, producing, writing, and owning all of it."

Commercial
T.K.O. (The Knock Out) debuted at number forty-one on the Independent Albums chart.

Accolades

Track listing

Notes
  signifies a co-producer
  signifies an additional producer
  signifies a vocal producer

Sample credits
"The Fall" contains a musical interpolation of "Saudade Vem Correndo" and a lyrical interpolation of "Fallen".
"Open" contains an interpolation of "My Life" by Mary J. Blige.
"Damage" contains an excerpt of "Breakin' My Heart (Pretty Brown Eyes)" by Mint Condition.
"Ready (Part III – 90's Bedroom Mix)" contains an interpolation of "It Seems Like You're Ready" by R. Kelly.
"T.K.O. Interlude" contains an interpolation of "Love T.K.O." by Teddy Pendergrass.

Personnel

Instruments
 Guitars – Lamar "MyGuyMars" Edwards,  Andrew White, Matt Spatola

Technical and production
 Engineering – Mya Harrison, Derek Anderson 
 Mastering – Malcolm Tariq
 Mixing – Derek Anderson, Malcolm Tariq
 Production – Lamar "MyGuyMars" Edwards, Lyle LeDuff, Philip "Hardwerk" Constable, Carlos McKinney
 Additional production – Khirye Tyler

Visuals and imagery
 Graphic design – Theresa Harrison, Carlos Perales 
 Photography – Reesee of Zigga Zagga, Baxter Stapleton
 Videography – Josh Sikkema, Dana Rice, Baxter Stapleton, Michael Korte, Kumari Suraj, Jeremy Strong, Kaelynn Harris, Oth'than, Kelly Yvonne, Ysabelle Capitule

Charts

Release history

References

External links

2018 albums
Mýa albums
Albums produced by Mars (record producer)